Esi Benyarku (born 28 November 1976) is a Canadian sprinter. She competed in the women's 100 metres at the 2000 Summer Olympics.

References

External links
 
 

1976 births
Living people
Athletes (track and field) at the 2000 Summer Olympics
Canadian female sprinters
Olympic track and field athletes of Canada
World Athletics Championships athletes for Canada
Ghanaian emigrants to Canada
Black Canadian female track and field athletes
People from Tema
Olympic female sprinters